Boschertown is an unincorporated community in St. Charles County, in the U.S. state of Missouri.

History
A post office called Boschertown was established in 1879, and remained in operation until 1881. The community has the name of John Boscher, a pioneer citizen.

References

Unincorporated communities in St. Charles County, Missouri
Unincorporated communities in Missouri